Hypselodelphys is a group of plants in the Marantaceae described as a genus in 1950. native to tropical Africa from Liberia to Uganda and south to Angola. It contains 8 recognized species:

 species

References

Marantaceae
Zingiberales genera